Melinis nerviglumis is a species of grass known by the common names mountain red top or bristle-leaved red top. The Latin name refers to the veined glume. It is native from tropical to southern Africa, the western Indian Ocean islands, and Indochina. It is cultivated as a garden ornamental due to its colourful purple flowers. The flowers are produced in summer and fade to white as they mature. By this time the seeds can be harvested for new plantings.

Gallery

References

Panicoideae